Strange Fruit is a 2004 film written and directed by Kyle Schickner and starring Kent Faulcon as William Boyals and Berlinda Tolbert as Emma Ayers. It was produced by FenceSitter Films. The title comes from the 1939 Billie Holiday song.

Premise
New York attorney William Boyals has escaped the Louisiana bayou of his childhood, but he must return to investigate the death of a childhood friend who, like Boyals himself, was both black and gay.

Cast
Kent Faulcon as William Boyals
Berlinda Tolbert as Emma Ayers
David Raibon as Duane Ayers
Christopher Warren as Cedric
Sam Jones as Sheriff Jensey
Vergil J. Smith as Jo-Jo
Shane Woodson as Jordan Walker
Ed Brigadier as Arnold West
Charlie Schroeder as Tommy
Jared Day as Deputy Conover
Jon Finck as Deputy Adams
Ron Bottitta as Dep. Curtis Butler
Christopher May as Deputy Mathers
Cecile M. Johnson as Martha Boyals
Alex Boling as Paulie (voice)
Emily Gorgen as Tanya
Earl Thompson as Manny
Harace Carpenter as Buddy Bleu
Leon Morenzie as Walter Durant
Ron Allen as Kelvin Ayers
Walt Turner as Jerry West
Wilbert Lewis as Preacher
Gavin Lewis as André
Carlo Daquin as Derrik
Tommy Cole as Diesel
Tory Andrews as Angry Gaytor Patron
Arthur LeBlanc as Cyril
Randy Maggiore	as Lowell
Lakesha Lenoir as Ruby
Ted Duhon as Deputy Guidry
Agnes DeRouen as Reporter
Richard Pushkin as Doctor
David L. Corrigan as Deputy Blaine

Production
When told by producers, who had offered the film a $6 million budget, that the lead character could not be both black and gay, Kyle Schickner left the studio to produce the film for only $250,000.

References

External links
 
 FenceSitterFilms official site

2004 films
African-American LGBT-related films
American LGBT-related films
Films about race and ethnicity
Films set in Louisiana
FenceSitter Films films
2004 drama films
African-American drama films
LGBT-related drama films
2004 LGBT-related films
2000s English-language films
2000s American films